Funan was an ancient state in mainland Southeast Asia.

Funan may also refer to:

Buildings
Funan DigitaLife Mall, demolished shopping mall in Singapore
Funan, current shopping mall in Singapore

Films
Funan (film), a 2018 animated drama film directed by Denis Do.

Regions
Funan County, Anhui, China

Others
local Xiang Chinese pronunciation of Hunan